Moulin Rouge! Music from Baz Luhrmann's Film, Vol. 2 is a soundtrack album to Baz Luhrmann's 2001 film Moulin Rouge! It was released on February 26, 2002. It is the follow-up to the original soundtrack, which was released a year prior. The album features original film versions of some songs, remixes and instrumentals.

Track listing

Charts

Release history

References 

2000s film soundtrack albums
2002 soundtrack albums
Interscope Records soundtracks
Moulin Rouge!